The Ministry of Mines and Energy is a ministry of the government of Togo. The head office is in Lomé. As of 2013 Dammipi Noupokou is the minister.

References

External links

 Ministry of Mines and Energy 

Government of Togo
Togo
Togo